The city of Glasgow, Scotland, has many amenities for a wide range of cultural activities, from curling to opera and from football to art appreciation; it also has a large selection of museums that include those devoted to transport, religion, and modern art. In 2009 Glasgow was awarded the title UNESCO Creative City of Music in recognition of its vibrant live music scene and its distinguished heritage. Glasgow has three major universities, each involved in creative and literary arts, and the city has the largest public reference library in Europe in the form of the Mitchell Library. Scotland's largest newspapers and national television and radio companies are based in the city.

Art
The Kelvingrove Art Gallery and Museum houses renowned art work and paintings including many old masters, Dutch, Italian, French Impressionists, etc. and the Scottish Colourists, and Glasgow Boys. The Hunterian Museum and Art Gallery, of the University of Glasgow, has what is considered to be the best collection of Whistler paintings in the world. The Burrell Collection of international art and antiquities donated to the city by Sir William Burrell is housed in an award-winning museum in the Pollok Country Park. The People's Palace museum in Glasgow Green reflects the history of the city and its people, focusing on the working class of Glasgow. The Riverside Museum on the Clyde focuses on shipping, transport and city life. Glasgow School of Art designed by Charles Rennie Mackintosh continues its pre-eminence in art, design and architecture, including its Digital Design Studio across the River Clyde in Pacific Quay. The Gallery of Modern Art is on Royal Exchange Square, just off George Square. The Glasgow Print Studio is on Trongate, it provides workshop and gallery space for printmakers with regularly changing exhibitions.

Museums

Glasgow's museums and galleries include:

The Riverside Museum (Winner of the European Museum of the Year Award 2013)
Kelvingrove Art Gallery and Museum
The Burrell Collection
Collins Gallery
Fossil Grove
The Gallery of Modern Art (GOMA)
Glenlee, a museum ship
Hunterian Museum and Art Gallery
The Lighthouse, Scotland's Centre for Architecture, Design and the City
McLellan Galleries
Museum of Transport
The People's Palace
Pollok House
Provand's Lordship
St Mungo Museum of Religious Life and Art
Scottish Football Museum
Scotland Street School Museum
National Museum of Scottish Country Life
National Museum of Piping

Libraries

 Glasgow University Library
 Strathclyde University Library
 Glasgow Caledonian University Library
 Glasgow Women's Library
 Mitchell Library
 Stirling's Library

Community libraries
Glasgow has 32 community libraries across the city, run by Glasgow Life.

 Anniesland Library
 Ballieston Library
 Barmulloch Library
 Bridgeton Library
 Castlemilk Library
 Cardonald Library
 Couper Institute (Cathcart)
 Dennistoun Library
 Drumchapel Library
  (Govan)
 Gallery of Modern Art (GoMA)
 Gorbals Library
 Govanhill Library
 Hillhead Library
 Ibrox Library
 Langside Library
 Knightswood Library
 Library at The Bridge (Easterhouse)
 Maryhill Library
 Milton Library
 Parkhead Library
 Partick Library
 Pollok Library
 Pollokshaws Library
 Pollokshields Library
 Possilpark Library
 Royston Library
 Riddrie Library
 Shettleston Library
 Springburn Library
 Woodside Library
 Whiteinch Library

Entertainment
Most of Scotland's national companies including Scottish Opera, Scottish Ballet, National Theatre of Scotland and the Royal Scottish National Orchestra are based here as is the BBC Scottish Symphony Orchestra. The Royal Conservatoire of Scotland is one of Britain's longest established performing conservatoires, and its recently opened Alexander Gibson Opera School is the first purpose built opera school in Britain. The National Piping Centre is an international teaching centre. The city also has a longstanding and lively popular music scene based around venues such as the SECC, the O2 Academy, Barrowlands, Cosmopol and King Tut's Wah Wah Hut. Glasgow is the first city in Britain to be awarded the UNESCO City of Music accolade.  Glasgow also has major cinema complexes in the city centre and at locations on the Clyde and at out of town shopping centres.

Theatres
Glasgow has a number of theatres, including:

Citizens Theatre
 Cottiers Theatre 
King's Theatre
Mitchell Theatre
Òran Mór
Pavilion Theatre
Royal Conservatoire of Scotland New Athenaeum Theatre
Tramway, and production centre of Scottish Ballet
Tron Theatre
Theatre Royal, home of Scottish Opera and of Scottish Ballet
Websters Theatre

Concert halls

Glasgow Royal Concert Hall, home of Royal Scottish National Orchestra
Glasgow City Halls, home of the BBC Scottish Symphony Orchestra
Old Fruitmarket part of the City Halls
Scottish Exhibition and Conference Centre
SEC Armadillo which also stages theatre shows
The SSE Hydro Arena

Performing arts

The Arches (Glasgow)
Centre for Contemporary Arts (CCA)
City of Glasgow Chorus
The National Piping Centre
Amateur dramatics in Glasgow

Parks
Glasgow has over 100 parks, gardens, recreational areas, green spaces and cemeteries across its area. Glasgow City Council manages a great number of these.

Glasgow City Council city and district parks (twenty of the total Glasgow City Council parks):

Alexandra Park
Auchinlea Park
Bellahouston Park
Cathkin Braes Country Park
Dams to Darnley Country Park
Darnley Mill Park
Dawsholm Park
Garscadden Burn Park
George Square
Glasgow Botanic Gardens
Glasgow Green
Hogganfield Park and Loch
Kelvingrove Park
Linn Park
Pollok Country Park
Queen's Park
Ruchill Park
Springburn Park
Tollcross Park
Victoria Park

Glasgow City Council local parks:

Ardmay Park
Ashtree Park
Auldhouse Park
Barlanark Park
Barrachnie Park
Beardmore Park
Bennan Square
Bingham's Pond
Blairtummock Park
Bridgeton Park
Broomfield Park
Broomhouse Park
Buckingham Park
Budhill Park
Cardonald Park
Carmunnock Coppice Woodland
Carmunnock Village Green
Carmyle New Park
Castlemilk Park
Cathedral Square
Cathkin Park
Citizens Rose Garden
Cowlairs Park
Cranhill Park
Croftcoighn Park
Cross Park
Crosshill Park
Dowanhill Park
Drumchapel Park
Duchray Park
Early Braes Park
Eastfield Park
Elder Park 
Festival Park
Garnethill Park
Garrowhill Park
Glenconner Park
Gorbals New Park
Govanhill Park
Greenbank Park
Greenfield Park
Hayburn Park
Helenslea Park
Hogarth Park
Holmlea Park
Househill Park
James Lindsay Park
King George V Park
King's Park
Knightswood Park
Lochar Park
Mansewood Park
Mansfield Park
Maryhill Park
Maxwell Park
Milton Park
Molendinar Park
Mount Vernon Park
Naesby Park
Newlands Park
Orchard Park
Penilee Park
Petershill Park
Plantation Park
Priesthill Park
Riccarton Street Park
Richmond Park
Riddrie Park
Robroyston Park
Rosshall Park and Gardens
Sandyhills Park
Sherbourne Park
Sighthill Park
Spire Park
Temple Park
Thornwood Park
Titwood Park
Toryglen Park
Yoker Park

Festivals

As part of Glasgow's cultural renaissance, Glasgow is host to a variety of festivals throughout the year:-

Celtic Connections – January
Glasgow Film Festival – February
Glasgow International Comedy Festival – March
Glasgow International Festival (Visual Arts) – April
Glasgow Art Fair – April
Charles Rennie Mackintosh Festival
Big Big Country – May (last held in 2006)
West End Festival – June
Lord Provost's Procession (discontinued)
Glasgow International Jazz Festival – June
North Glasgow International Festival (last held in 2005)
Bard in the Botanics – July
Glasgow's River Festival – July
Pride Glasgow – July
Glasgow Mela – June
Piping Live! – August
World Pipe Band Championships – August
Merchant City Festival – September
Glasgay! – November
Glasgow's Hogmanay – December
Glasgow Orange walks

Glasgow has also hosted the National Mòd no less than thirteen times since 1895 in 1895, 1901, 1907, 1911, 1921, 1933, 1938, 1948, 1958, 1967, 1988, 1990 and 2019.

Exhibitions
The city was host to the three Great Exhibitions at Kelvingrove Park, in 1888 (International Exhibition), 1901 (Glasgow International Exhibition) and 1911 (Scottish Exhibition, Art and Industry). It later hosted the Empire Exhibition in 1938 and the Industrial exhibits of the Festival of Britain at the Kelvin Hall in 1951. More recently it held the Glasgow Garden Festival in 1988 and was European Capital of Culture in 1990, National City of Sport 1995–1999, UK City of Architecture and Design 1999 and European Capital of Sport 2003. The city hosted the 2014 Commonwealth Games.

Contemporary music

Glasgow was awarded the title UNESCO City of Music in recognition of its live music scene. 

Glasgow has many live music pubs, clubs and venues. Some of the city's main venues include the Glasgow Royal Concert Hall, the SECC and King Tut's Wah Wah Hut (where Oasis were spotted and signed by Glaswegian record mogul Alan McGee), the Queen Margaret Union and the Barrowland, a historic ballroom, converted into a live music venue. More recent mid-sized venues include ABC, Stereo, The Old Hairdressers and the Carling Academy, which play host to a similar range of acts. Numerous small venues, cafes and bars play host to the many smaller local and touring bands which regularly play in the city.

Glasgow is also home to a thriving electronic music scene, with a particularly strong reputation for techno and house music. Venues like the Arches and the Sub Club, record labels such as Soma and Chemikal Underground and clubnights such as Optimo have supported this strong underground movement for the past two decades in the city.

The city also boasts a flourishing experimental music scene, and plays home to Alex Neilson and Richard Youngs. Glasgow hosts the long-running Install and Subcurrent annual festivals, which have featured underground artists such as Gustav Metzger and Tony Conrad, as well as reclusive American musician Jandek's first ever live performance. The Soundlab season at Glasgow Concert Halls presents excellent Scottish and international artists; while the Minimal Glasgow season features major names like Steve Reich and Philip Glass alongside up and coming acts.

A known noise rock act from Glasgow in the late nineties was Urusei Yatsura. In recent years, the success of bands such as Chvrches, Franz Ferdinand, Belle & Sebastian, Camera Obscura and Mogwai has significantly boosted the profile of the Glasgow music scene, prompting Time magazine to liken Glasgow to Detroit during its 1960s Motown heyday.

See also
 Architecture of Glasgow

References

 
Glasgow